Stephen Angulalik (ca. 1898–1980) was an internationally known Ahiarmiut Inuit from northern Canada notable as a Kitikmeot fur trader and trading post operator at Kuugjuaq (Perry River), Northwest Territories. His stories and photos were carried by journals and periodicals worldwide.

Early life
His parents, Oakoak (father) and Okalitaaknahik (mother), were Caribou Inuit.

In 1923, Angulalik lived on the Kent Peninsula near a Hudson's Bay Company (HBC) post.  The post had opened three years earlier and was run by Hugh Clarke; it was the most remote HBC post of the Canadian Arctic. Angulalik learned the fur trading business from Clarke. In 1926, Clarke and George Porter opened a Canalaska trading post for owner Captain Christian Theodore Pedersen in Perry River, probably because of Ahiarmiut relocation to that area, the Kent Peninsula caribou becoming scarce.  In addition to the trading post, Clarke built a home for Angulalik, ensuring Ahiarmiut loyalty to the Canalaska post, rather than an HBC post
a few miles away (run by Angus Gavin between April 1937 and July 1941).

Career
In 1928, when new laws forced the closure of both posts, Angulalik continued as an independent trader, supplied by Canalaska. When Pedersen sold his company to the HBC, the sale included a provision for the HBC in Cambridge Bay to continue supplying trade goods to Angulalik. In 1929, Angulalik sailed to Herschel Island and purchased a schooner, the "Tudlik", from Canalaska, using the "Tudlik" during his career to transport goods from Cambridge Bay or Herschel Island to his trading post.

Angulalik's trade partners included distant Copper Inuit bands such as the Hanningajurmiut of Garry Lake (Hanningajuq, meaning "sideways" or "crooked"). The Hanningajurmiut were called the Ualininmiut ("people from area of which the sun follows east to west") by their Caribou Inuit neighbors of the north, the Utkusiksalinmiut. He also traded with the Illuilirmiut of Illuiliq from Adelaide Peninsula. As these Inuit were located between Angulalik's Perry River post and the Gjoa Haven HBC post, Angulalik set up an outpost closer to them at Sherman Inlet to secure their business. It was run by Angulalik's adopted son, George Oakoak, from 1948 to 1955.

Angulalik's trading ventures were successful despite the fact that he was unable to speak or write English. He either got help from other people or copied the words from the boxes that he received. This, according to at least one source, led to him ordering such things as "5 cases of This Side Up".

A crisis event occurred in Angulalik's life New Year's Eve 1956, when he stabbed the man Otoetok, in self-defense. While Otoetok’s wounds were minor, leaving them untended resulted in his painful death on January 4, 1957, leading Angulalik to sell his Perry River trading operations to the HBC the same year.  Judge John Sissons presided over the murder trial in Cambridge Bay and Angulalik was acquitted. He returned to the Perry River post and worked with the new young manager, Red Pedersen, who became a lifelong friend.  Angulalik stayed there until post closure in 1967.

Personal life
There were no taboos against polygamy amongst the Ahiarmiut.  By October 1937, Angulalik had two wives and the three of them were pictured in Life Magazine. Angulalik's first wife was named Kuptana; she died in 1939. His second wife was Koloahok; she died in 1938.  No longer a polygamist, Angulalik was baptised "Stephen" in 1938, according to Royal Canadian Mounted Police Sergeant Henry Larsen. In 1941, Angulalik married Mabel Ekvana, about age 16, with whom he raised 11 children.

In 1967, Angulalik and Ekvana moved to Cambridge Bay, sent their children to the local school, and spent most of the year in a settled existence, but every summer, they returned to Perry River. Unlike other adults, Angulalik could neither read or write Inuktitut. He enjoyed photography, however, owning cameras and photographic equipment.  His photos are part of a collection at the heritage center in Yellowknife.

See also
Notable Aboriginal people of Canada

Awards
1935, King George V Silver Jubilee Medal
1953, Queen Elizabeth II Coronation Medal

References

Further reading
Keith, D., Stephen Angulalik: Kitikmeot Fur Trader. 2004. Kitikmeot Heritage Society (Full text plus photos)
McGrath, Robin. A Northern Biography, Stephen Angulalik, (1895–1980). S.l: s.n, 1981.

External links 
Maps

 Photo
 Stephen Angulalik, Kitikmeot Fur Trader in Inuinnaqtun, English and French
 Prince of Wales Northern Heritage Centre – Images of Anagulalik and family
 Angulalik at Library and Archives Canada

Inuit from the Northwest Territories
People from Cambridge Bay
People acquitted of murder
1890s births
1980 deaths